, is a Japanese female racing driver who currently races in Formula Regional Japanese Championship.

Career
Miura's single seater career began due to the influence of her father and brother. At the age of 12, she participated in a kart race for the first time and eventually won the championship. After that, she honed her skills in karting. At Osaka Sangyo University, where she studied Mechanical Engineering, she was one of the drivers of their solar car project, participating in the yearly FIA Solar Car Race at the Suzuka Circuit, taking several victories throughout the years.

In 2011, she participated in Super FJ (Suzuka) with the support of Exedy in recognition of her success in karting. After graduating from university one year later, she became an employee of Exedy and participated in Formula Challenge Japan (FCJ) while enrolled in the public relations department of the company.

In 2014, she made her debut in the Japanese Formula 3 Championship (N class), being the first female driver in the series in 18 years. She finished on the podium at the opening race held at Suzuka Circuit, and took her first victory in the following 2nd round, finally finishing in 4th place in the series. In 2015, she continued to participate in the N class of the All Japan F3 Championship, winning 3 races and finishing 2nd.

From 2016 until 2018, she was part of the B-MAX Racing Team, achieving a best race result of 4th Overall and 8th in the standings (both the best ever for a female in the series). The following year, in 2019, she joined ThreeBond Racing and continued participated in the All-Japan F3 Championship (C class). In 2020, she participated in the KYOJO CUP for LHG Racing with YLT, winning the championship in her first try. In addition, she also took part in a few races in the Formula Regional Japanese Championship in place of Tomoki Takahashi with the Super License team. She took her first podium at the Twin Ring Motegi. In 2021, she finished as runner-up of the championship, taking her first win at Fuji Speedway during the season, while also competing in Super Taikyu.

Racing record

Karting
2001 
 1st SL Meihan Final Round FP3-F Class
2002 
 Suzuka Championship - RSO class
2003
 3rd Suzuka Championship - OPEN class
 6th Suzuka Championship - JRMC class
 2004
 2nd RotaxMax Junior class
 2nd Suzuka Championship - JRMC class
 11th Macau International Kart GP - JrMAX Class 
 9th Asia Pacific Championship - MAX Class 
 2005
 5th Rotax Max - Junior class
 2nd Suzuka Championship - JRMC class
 18th EuroChallenge UK round - Junior Class
 2006
 4th Rotax Max - Senior class
 2nd Mizunami Challenge Cup - RMC Class
 31st EuroChallenge in Italy - Senior Class
 28th EuroChallenge in Austria - Senior Class
 Ret EuroChallenge in Belgium - Senior Class
 6th Macau International Kart GP SrMAX class
 2007
 19th RotaxMax Senior Class
 Participation in EuroChallenge - Senior class
 2008
 8th Rotax Max - Senior class
 Participated in the Japan Open Masters
 2009
 11th Rotax Max Senior class
 Participated in the Japan Open Masters
 2010
 9th Rotax Max Senior Class

 FIA Solar Car Race Suzuka
 2009: 1st, 2010: 1st, 2011: 2nd, 2012: 1st, 2013: 1st, 2014: 1st, 2016: 1st

Career summary

‡ Team standings.

References

External links
 
 

1989 births
Living people
Japanese racing drivers
Formula Regional Japanese Championship drivers

Japanese Formula 3 Championship drivers
B-Max Racing drivers